Port Authority Police Department usually refers to the Port Authority of New York and New Jersey Police Department.

Port Authority Police Department may also refer to other transit police organizations:
Port Authority Police Department (Allegheny County), a law enforcement agency in Pennsylvania